Athrips polymaculella is a moth of the family Gelechiidae. It is found in the southern Krasnojarsk region (Minussinsk) and Chitinskaja oblast in Siberia, China (Henan), Korea, Japan and Taiwan. There are records from the eastern part of European Russia (the southern Ural), but these need confirmation.

The wingspan is 13–16 mm. The forewings are light grey mottled with numerous black scales, which form small indistinct black spots at the base and three paired spots in the middle of the wing. There are two yellowish white patches at two-thirds and an indistinct white fascia at three-fourths. The hindwings are grey. Adults are on wing in May in Korea and from the end of May to June in Russia.

References

Moths described in 1991
Athrips
Moths of Asia